Lecithocera choritis is a moth in the family Lecithoceridae. It was described by Edward Meyrick in 1910. It is found in southern India.

The wingspan is 21–23 mm. The forewings are pale ochreous yellowish, irregularly and variably irrorated (sprinkled) with purplish fuscous and dark fuscous. The discal stigmata are represented by round dark purplish-fuscous spots, connected by a central elongate patch of pale ground colour. The hindwings are grey.

References

Moths described in 1910
choritis